Rafael Candra Wijaya (born 16 September 1975) is a retired Indonesian badminton player.

Career 
Wijaya started his career in badminton at the age of five, motivated by his brother Indra Wijaya and later joined a club in Cirebon. His father, Hendra Wijaya, then took him to a club Pelita Jakarta when he was fourteen. In 1991, he was selected to join the national team. In 1998, he moved to Jaya Raya Jakarta.

Wijaya is a doubles specialist. He has been rated among the best men's doubles players in the world for over a decade. Noted for his ability in all phases of the doubles game, he has reached the final of the BWF World Championships three times with countryman Sigit Budiarto. They won the 1997 edition in Glasgow, Scotland and finished second in 2003 and 2005. With Tony Gunawan he captured the men's doubles gold medal at the 2000 Olympics in Sydney. Though Budiarto has been his most frequent partner, Wijaya has won top tier men's doubles events (and a mixed doubles event or two) with a variety of players, recently renewing an earlier partnership with Gunawan. Wijaya was a member of the world champion Indonesia Thomas Cup (men's international) teams of 1998, 2000, and 2002. He was named IBF Player of the Year and received the Eddie Choong awards in 2000.

In 2007 he joined the Japanese club owned by Tonami.

Personal life 
Wijaya was born in a badminton family. His father Hendra Wijaya introduced him to badminton at the young age. His siblings, Indra Wijaya, Rendra Wijaya and Sandrawati Wijaya also a former national badminton players. He married Maria Caroline Indriani on 20 January 2001 at St. Thomas Rasul Church in Cengkareng. They have two children Gabriel Christopher Wintan Wijaya and Christina Joshephine Wintania Wijaya.

He was a founder of Candra Wijaya International Badminton Centre, and Candra Wijaya badminton club.

Participation at Indonesian Team 
 6 times at Sudirman Cup (1997, 1999, 2001, 2003, 2005, 2007)
 6 times at Thomas Cup (1998, 2000, 2002, 2004, 2006, 2008)

Achievements

Olympic Games 
Men's doubles

World Championships 
Men's doubles

World Cup 
Men's doubles

Asian Championships 
Men's doubles

Asian Cup 
Men's doubles

Southeast Asian Games 
Men's doubles

Mixed doubles

World Junior Championships 
Mixed doubles

BWF Superseries (1 title, 3 runners-up) 
The BWF Superseries, which was launched on 14 December 2006 and implemented in 2007, is a series of elite badminton tournaments, sanctioned by the Badminton World Federation (BWF). BWF Superseries levels are Superseries and Superseries Premier. A season of Superseries consists of twelve tournaments around the world that have been introduced since 2011. Successful players are invited to the Superseries Finals, which are held at the end of each year.

Men's doubles

  BWF Superseries Finals tournament
  BWF Superseries Premier tournament
  BWF Superseries tournament

BWF Grand Prix 
The BWF Grand Prix had two levels, the BWF Grand Prix and Grand Prix Gold. It was a series of badminton tournaments sanctioned by the Badminton World Federation (BWF) which was held from 2007 to 2017. The World Badminton Grand Prix sanctioned by International Badminton Federation (IBF) from 1983 to 2006.

Men's doubles

Mixed doubles

  BWF Grand Prix Gold tournament
  BWF & IBF Grand Prix tournament

IBF International 
Men's doubles

Performance timeline

National team 
 Senior level

Individual competitions 
 Senior level

References

External links 
 
 
 
 

1975 births
Living people
People from Cirebon
Sportspeople from West Java
Indonesian sportspeople of Chinese descent
Indonesian male badminton players
Badminton players at the 2000 Summer Olympics
Olympic gold medalists for Indonesia
Olympic medalists in badminton
Medalists at the 2000 Summer Olympics
Olympic badminton players of Indonesia
Badminton players at the 1998 Asian Games
Badminton players at the 2002 Asian Games
Asian Games gold medalists for Indonesia
Asian Games silver medalists for Indonesia
Asian Games medalists in badminton
Medalists at the 1998 Asian Games
Medalists at the 2002 Asian Games
Competitors at the 1997 Southeast Asian Games
Competitors at the 2001 Southeast Asian Games
Southeast Asian Games gold medalists for Indonesia
Southeast Asian Games silver medalists for Indonesia
Southeast Asian Games medalists in badminton
World No. 1 badminton players